In total, 27 handballers to date have scored 1000 or more goals for their national teams at senior level.

A vast majority of the players who scored at least 1000 goals, are from the modern era of the sport. This is partly because fewer games were played at international level than today.
Péter Kovács held the record for most goals scored, until Guðjón Valur Sigurðsson beat his record in 2018. France is the country with the most entries on this list, with four players having scored 1000 or more goals. Only two players on this list have played for two different federations. Frank-Michael Wahl scored 1338 goals for East Germany and 74 goals for the German national team, also Talant Duyshebaev, who scored  for USSR, Unified Team and Russia and 569 goals for Spain. Only goals scored at the highest international level are included, meaning goals for national junior and youth teams aren't. Only one player scoring more than 1000 goals managed to reach a goals per game ratio 7.0 and above, while the lowest ratio is 3.09. Out of 27 players to score 1000 or more goals in history, only 10 of them have won the World Championship at least once. Ahmed El-Ahmar is the only non-European player to appear on this list.

By player 

updated as of January 31. 2023
Players in bold are still active.

See also
List of European Cup and EHF Champions League top scorers
World Men's Handball Championship
European Men's Handball Championship

References

European
Handball trophies and awards